Caldicoprobacter algeriensis  is a Gram-positive, thermophilic, anaerobic and non-motile bacterium from the genus of Caldicoprobacter which has been isolated from a hot spring from Guelma in Algeria.

References

 

Eubacteriales
Bacteria described in 2012
Thermophiles